Telefónica most often refers to:
Telefónica, a Spanish-multinational telecommunications company

Telefónica may also refer to:

Buildings
Distrito Telefónica, worldwide headquarters of Telefónica
Telefónica Building, flagship store and former headquarters

Businesses
Telefónica Germany, German subdivision of Telefónica
Telefônica Vivo, Brazilian subdivision of Telefónica
Telefónica Europe, former European subdivision of Telefónica

Sailing
Telefónica Blue, an Ocean Race yacht
Telefónica (yacht), an Ocean Race yacht